Bénédicte de Raphélis Soissan is a French entrepreneur. She and her company were recognised as promising start-ups in 2018.

de Raphélis Soissan holds two master's degrees: in economics and applied mathematics, and in information systems strategy, management and consulting.

de Raphélis Soissan is the founder of Clustree, a business using artificial intelligence to remove bias from hiring and promotion decisions.

The company has signed contracts with L'Oréal, Sanofi and Carrefour.

Public speaking 
de Raphélis Soissan has spoken at events such as Viva Tech and SaaStock.

Awards 
In 2017, de Raphélis Soissan was selected by Forbes as a 30under30 laureate. 
In 2018, she was selected as one of the Forbes Europe's Top 50 Women in Tech.

References 

Year of birth missing (living people)
Living people
21st-century French businesswomen
21st-century French businesspeople